Robert Walden (born 1943) is an American actor.

Robert Walden may also refer to:
Robert Walden (swimmer), Australian Paralympic swimmer
Robert Walden (MP) for Warwick (UK Parliament constituency)
Robert Lee Walden (born 1966), American murderer
R. Wyndham Walden (1844–1905), American horse trainer
Bobby Walden (1938–2018), American football professional